Acidogona dichromata is a species of tephritid or fruit flies in the genus Acidogona of the family Tephritidae.

Distribution
Canada, United States.

References

Tephritinae
Insects described in 1894
Taxa named by Francis H. Snow
Diptera of North America